The rapid shallow breathing index (RSBI) or Yang Tobin index is a tool that is used in the weaning of mechanical ventilation on intensive care units. The RSBI is defined as the ratio of respiratory frequency to tidal volume (f/VT). People on a ventilator who cannot tolerate independent breathing tend to breathe rapidly (high frequency) and shallowly (low tidal volume), and will therefore have a high RSBI.  The index was introduced in 1991 by Karl Yang and Martin J. Tobin.

Equation

Measurement 
Measurement is done with a handheld spirometer attached to the endotracheal tube while a patient breathes room air for one minute without any ventilator assistance.

Example 
As an example, a patient who has a respiratory rate of 25 breaths/min and an average tidal volume of 250 mL/breath has an RSBI = (25 breaths/min)/(0.25 L) = 100 breaths/min/L.  

In contrast, the 'average' patient breathing 12 breaths/min, with a tidal volume of 420 mL/breath (70kg x 6 mL/kg) would have an RSBI = (12 breaths/min)/(.420 L) = 28 breaths/min/L.  

The higher the RSBI, the more distressed the patient is generally considered to be.

History 
The concept was introduced in a 1991 paper by physicians Karl Yang and Martin J. Tobin from the University of Texas Health Science Center at Houston and Stritch School of Medicine at Loyola University in Chicago.

Weaning readiness 
A RSBI score of less than 65 indicating a relatively low respiratory rate compared to tidal volume is generally considered as an indication of weaning readiness.
A patient with a rapid shallow breathing index (RSBI) of less than 105 has an approximately 80% chance of being successfully extubated, whereas an RSBI of greater than 105 virtually guarantees weaning failure.
Other criteria that have been suggested for a successful weaning trial include (1) the ability to tolerate a Spontaneous breathing trial for 30 minutes (in most patients, SBT failure will occur within approximately 20 minutes), (2) maintain a respiration rate of less than 35/min, and (3) keep an oxygen saturation of 90% without arrhythmias; sudden increases in heart rate and blood pressure; or development of respiratory distress, diaphoresis, or anxiety. Once the SBT is tolerated, the ability to clear secretions, a decreasing secretion burden, and a patent upper airway are other criteria that should be met to increase extubation success.
Patients should be assessed daily for their readiness to be weaned from mechanical ventilation by withdrawing sedation and performing a spontaneous breathing trial.

References

Diagnostic intensive care medicine
Respiratory therapy
Respiration